Silent City is an album by New York City-based string quartet, Brooklyn Rider and Iranian musician Kayhan Kalhor, released by World Village Records in 2008.

Kalhor met members of Brooklyn Rider in 2000 at Tanglewood, where they took part in the cellist Yo-Yo Ma's Silk Road Project.

The title track is a Kalhor composition originally Included on Yo-Yo Ma's New Impossibilities, it is an elegy for Halabjah, a Kurdish city razed by Saddam Hussein.

Track listing
"Ascending Bird" (Siamak Aghaei,C. Jacobsen) – 6:54
"Silent City" (Kayhan Kalhor) – 29:10
"Parvaz" (Kalhor)  – 6:23
"Beloved, do not let me be discouraged" (C. Jacobsen ) – 10:34

Personnel
Kayhan Kalhor – Kamancheh, Setar
Brooklyn Rider
Colin Jacobsen – Violin
Jonathan Gandelsman – Violin
Nicholas Cords – Viola
Eric Jacobsen – Cello
Additional musicians 
Jeff Beecher – Bass
Mark Suter – Percussion
Siamak Aghaei – Tombak, Santur on "Parvaz"

Charts

References

External links
read more about The album title Track

Kayhan Kalhor albums
2008 albums
Collaborative albums